Freedom of Religion Act may refer to:
 US Religious Freedom Restoration Act of 1993
 US American Indian Religious Freedom Act of 1978
 Religious conversions in India#The Madhya Pradesh Freedom of Religion Act of 1968
 Religious conversions in India#The Orissa Freedom of Religions Act of 1968
 Religious conversions in India#The Arunachal Pradesh Freedom of Religion Act of 1978
 Gujarat Freedom of Religion Act of 2003
 Finland's Freedom of Religion act of 1923 (revised in 2003) - see Religion in Finland#Freedom of religion

See also 
 Freedom of religion
 Status of religious freedom by country
 :Category:Freedom of religion by country